Jerry van Rooyen (31 December 1928 in The Hague – 14 September 2009 in Goor) was a Dutch trumpeter, conductor, and composer. His works have appeared in films such as Free Enterprise and the British television series Spaced.

Biography 
Born Gerard Gijsbertus Jacobus van Rooijen, he studied trumpet at the Royal Conservatory of The Hague, graduating in 1950. While an exchange student in New York, he became enamored with American jazz, and (along with brother Ack) became a trailblazer for modern jazz in his home country of the Netherlands.

In his long musical career, Van Rooyen led various big bands in Paris, Berlin, Cologne (WDR Big Band) and Hilversum (Metropole Orchestra). He also wrote many arrangements and compositions for jazz orchestras, and in 1972, he was one of the three composers for the opening music of the Olympic Games in Munich.

External links 
 
 
 Obituary (in Dutch)

1928 births
2009 deaths
Dutch jazz trumpeters
Dutch jazz composers
Musicians from The Hague
Royal Conservatory of The Hague alumni
20th-century trumpeters
20th-century jazz composers